Activity system can refer to different systems:

In medicine or anatomy:
As an older name for the Musculoskeletal system

As shorthand for:
A model employed in Soft systems methodology